Lealao (Chinanteco de San Juan Lealao), also known as Latani, is the most divergent of the Chinantecan languages of Mexico. It is spoken in northeast Oaxaca, in the towns of San Juan Lealao, Latani, Tres Arroyos, and La Hondura.

References

Chinantec languages